Clase Z "Tropical" (Class Z Tropical) is a Cuban short film directed by Miguel Coyula. The film is a parody of Hollywood's action blockbusters using the typical trailer of a B-movie. The director deconstructs action melodrama formulas using the structure of a trailer. The movie contains frantic pacing, use of split screens, and dark humor, and the short gained notable popularity in Cuban Film Festivals where Coyula won several awards. The short is 6 minutes long and has been aired on Cuban TV Shows several times since its release in 2000. Coyula described the film a part of a series of experiments in genre the director made before completing the feature length Red Cockroaches.

Awards

 FIPRESCI Award, Festival el Almacén de la Imagen, Cuba
 Cinema Award, Festival el Almacén de la Imagen, Cuba
 Best Experimental Film, Festival el Almacén de la Imagen, Cuba
 Best Editing, Festival el Almacén de la Imagen, Cuba 
 Best Sound, Festival el Almacén de la Imagen, Cuba 
 Best Experimental Short, Festival Nacional de Video, Havana, Cuba.
 Best Editing, Festival Nacional de Video, Havana, Cuba.
 Best Sound,  Festival Nacional de Video, Havana, Cuba.
  Hermanos Saiz Award, Festival Nacional de Video, Havana, Cuba.

External links
 
 Interview with the director of Clase Z Tropical

Cuban short films